Felicia dregei is an evergreen, glandular shrub of up to 1 m (5 ft) high, that is assigned to the family Asteraceae. The flower heads have about ten violet ray florets, encircling many yellow disc florets. This species grows in the Northern Cape and Western Cape provinces of South Africa.

Description 
Felicia dregei is an evergreen, upright, up to 1 m (5 ft) high shrub, and is very woody near its base, where it is covered with a brown, peeling bark. The older branches have elongated, indistinct short shoots, and end in long shoots. Most leaves have an entire margin, but there are also leaves with up to ten short teeth. The leaf surface is gray-green and velvety, due to short glandular and bristly hairs on both leaf surfaces. Rarely, the leaves do not have glands but only short bristles.

The flower heads sit individually on top of a short stalk at the top of the long shoots. The involucre is up to 1 cm (0.7 in) in diameter and consists of three to four rows of bracts. These bracts are overlapping, densely glandular, and have a papery margin in particular above the middle. In the center of each corolla are five anthers merged into a tube, through which the style grows when the floret opens, hoovering up the pollen on its shaft. At the tip of both style branches is a narrowly triangular appendage. The dry, one-seeded, indehiscent fruits called cypselae are dark brown with a yellowish brown ridge along the outline, elliptic, about 3 mm long and 1 mm wide, thinly silky haired but densely hairy on the edge, and the hairs seldom wear off.

Taxonomy 
As far as known, Felicia dregei was first collected for science by Johann Franz Drège in 1830, and described by Augustin Pyramus de Candolle in 1836. William Henry Harvey reassigned the species and made the combination Aster dregei in 1865. Karl August Otto Hoffmann distinguished a variation with somewhat deeper incised leaves as Felicia dregei var. incisa in 1905. In 1973 Jürke Grau considered these names synonymous. F. dregei is considered part of the section Lignofelicia.

Distribution and habitat 
Felicia dregei can be found in Little Namaqualand in the north to Saldanha and the Mountains bordering the Karoo in the west, South Africa, where it grows on dolorite koppies and slopes.

Conservation 
The continued survival of Felicia dregei is considered to be of least concern because its population is stable.

References

External links 
 line drawing of Felicia dregei
 distribution map of Felicia dregei

dregei
Endemic flora of South Africa
Plants described in 1836